Somerset Land District is one of the twenty land districts of Tasmania which are part of the Cadastral divisions of Tasmania. It was formerly one of the 18 counties of Tasmania.

The original parishes
On 15 January 1836 George Arthur, the Lieutenant Governor of the Island of Van Diemen's Land
proclaimed, via The Hobart Town Courier, the first counties and parishes to be surveyed in the colony.

 The County of Somerset, bounded on the north by a portion of the river South Esk, on the east by the Eastern tier to the Macquarie river, and thence by a line to Beaumont's rivulet, and by that rivulet to its junction with the Little Swanport river; on the south by the Little Swanport river, and by the southern boundaries of the parishes of Brisbane,  Oatlands,  Dulverton and Exmouth to the river Clyde, and on the west by a portion of the river Clyde, by lakes Crescent and Sorell, and by a line from lake Sorell to Wood's lake, and thence by the Lake river to its junction with the South Esk.

Hundreds and parishes proclaimed at this time were:
 The hundred of Lincoln
Chichester parish
Eskdale
Bramber
Cadbury
The hundred of Epping
Epping
Cleveland
Bathurst
Salisbury
The hundred of Cambleton
Cambleton
Wincanton
Eldon
Abercrombie
The hundred of Maitland
 Ramsbury
 Lincoln
 Tierney
 Lennox
The hundred of Auburn
 Denbigh
 Hill
 Chatsworth
 Milton
The hundred of Ross
 Ross
 Pakenham
 Glenmoriston
 Gibbs
The hundred of Cornwallis
 Peel
 East Grinstead
 Durham
 Cornwallis
The hundred of Brisbane
 Sligo
 Bandon
 Brisbane
 Oatlands
The hundred of Tunbridge
 Dulverton
 Exmouth
 Maxwell
 another parish unnamed

Townships in the county were proclaimed Perth (portion of), Lincoln, Llewellyn,  Campbelton, Abercrombie, Tierney, Maitland, Grindelwald, Auburn (portion of), Ross, East Grinstead, Cornwallis, Andover, Oatlands (portion of), Tunbridge.

References

Land Districts of Tasmania